The 2014 International Bernese Ladies Cup was held from January 10 to 12 at the Curlingbahn Allmend in Bern, Switzerland as part of the 2013–14 World Curling Tour. The event was held in a triple-knockout format, and the purse for the event was CHF 20,500, of which the winner, Eve Muirhead, received CHF 6,000. Muirhead defeated Anna Sidorova of Russia in the final with a score of 6–3.

Teams
The teams are listed as follows:

Knockout results
The draw is as follows:

A event

B event

C event

Playoffs

References

External links

 
2014 in curling
2014 in Swiss sport
Women's curling competitions in Switzerland
International sports competitions hosted by Switzerland
Sport in Bern
2014 in women's curling
2014 in Swiss women's sport